Donohue Inc. was a Canadian company founded in 1920 as Murray River Power and Pulp Co. Limited and incorporated in Quebec. The company changed its name to Donohue Brothers Limited, in 1921, then to Donohue Company Limited, in 1970, and to Donohue Inc. in 1978. All shares were acquired by Abitibi-Consolidated Inc. in 2000 for $7.1 billion. The company was headquartered at 500 Sherbrooke Street West, Suite 800, Montreal, Quebec, Canada, H3A 3C6.

References 

Companies based in Montreal
Manufacturing companies established in 1920
Manufacturing companies disestablished in 2000
Companies formerly listed on the Toronto Stock Exchange
Pulp and paper companies of Canada
Defunct pulp and paper companies
1920 establishments in Quebec
2000 establishments in Quebec